Out of Reach may refer to:

 Out of Reach (film), a 2004 American film starring Steven Seagal
 Out of Reach (album), a 1978 album by Can
 "Out of Reach" (song), a 2001 song by Gabrielle
 "Out of Reach", a song by The Get Up Kids from the album Something to Write Home About

See also
 Just Out of Reach (disambiguation)
 "Out of My Reach", a song by Cass Fox
 Reach Out (disambiguation)